7th Army Aviation Regiment may refer to:
 7th Army Aviation Regiment (Italy)
 7th Army Aviation Regiment (Ukraine)